Patrick Stevens (born 31 January 1968 in Leut) is a retired sprinter from Belgium. He won the bronze medal in the 200 metres at the 1994 European Championships in Helsinki and a silver medal in the 200 m at the 2000 European Indoor Championships. He earned selection for four consecutive Olympic Games for his native country, although he was unable to compete at Sydney 2000 due to injury. His best result was seventh in the famous Michael Johnson 1996 200m WR final in Atlanta. He has also competed in four World Championships, between 1993 and 1999, finishing eighth in the 1997 200 m  final.

Stevens has a daughter called Lauryn with British athlete Denise Lewis.

International competitions

1Representing Europe

2Did not start in the semifinals

Personal bests

External links
 
 
 
 
 Profile and competition record 

1968 births
Living people
Belgian male sprinters
Athletes (track and field) at the 1988 Summer Olympics
Athletes (track and field) at the 1992 Summer Olympics
Athletes (track and field) at the 1996 Summer Olympics
Athletes (track and field) at the 2000 Summer Olympics
Olympic athletes of Belgium
World Athletics Championships athletes for Belgium
European Athletics Championships medalists
Universiade medalists in athletics (track and field)
People from Maasmechelen
Universiade bronze medalists for Belgium
Medalists at the 1991 Summer Universiade
Sportspeople from Limburg (Belgium)
20th-century Belgian people